Goopy Geer is a 1932 Warner Bros. Merrie Melodies cartoon short directed by Rudolf Ising, featuring the first appearance of the title character. The short was released on April 16, 1932, alongside the feature film The Crowd Roars.

Synopsis

The customers in a nightclub clamor for Goopy Geer, who then comes out on the stage and entertains them by playing the piano, first with his fingers and his ears, later with his animated gloves. He's soon accompanied by a girl who tells a joke and sings a song.

Meanwhile, the customers eat and carry on in slapstick ways, and two coat racks dance together.

Toward the end, a drunken horse spits fire and destroys the piano, but Goopy keeps right on playing.

Notes
 Two scenes—one involving a waiter, the other the drunken horse—are reused from the earlier Foxy short Lady, Play Your Mandolin! Also, one of the customers, a fat lady hippo, had also appeared in a Foxy short, Smile, Darn Ya, Smile!
 Goopy bears some resemblance to Disney's (unnamed at the time) Goofy who first came along 39 days later.

References

External links
 
Goopy Geer at the TCM Movie Database

 

1932 films
1932 animated films
American black-and-white films
Animated films about dogs
Films scored by Frank Marsales
Animated films about music and musicians
Films directed by Rudolf Ising
Merrie Melodies short films
Warner Bros. Cartoons animated short films
1930s Warner Bros. animated short films